IAIK-JCE is a Java-based Cryptographic Service Provider, which is being developed at the Institute for Applied Information Processing and Communications (IAIK) at the Graz University of Technology. It offers support for many commonly used cryptographic algorithms, such as hash functions, message authentication codes, symmetric, asymmetric, stream and block encryption. Its development started in 1996 and as such IAIK-JCE was one of the first Java-based cryptography providers. It is written entirely in Java and based on the same design principles as Oracle's JCA/JCE.

License 
Next to a commercial license, IAIK-JCE can also be obtained freely for academic purposes, evaluation and open-source development.

See also 
 Java Cryptography Architecture
 Java Cryptography Extension

External links

References 

Cryptographic software
Java (programming language) libraries